Ryōko or Ryouko is a Japanese female given name. The meanings of Ryoko vary depending on which Kanji is used to write the name.

Possible writings
 涼子 – "refreshing, child"
 亮子 – "helpful, child"
 良子 – "good, child"
 諒子 – "understanding, child"
 遼子 – "distant, child"

People

 Ryōko Akamatsu (born 1929), Japanese politician
Ryoko Azuma, (東 良子, born 1973) Japanese military officer
Ryōko Chiba, professional shogi player
Ryōko Hirosue (広末 涼子, born 1980), Japanese singer and actress
Ryōko Kihara (樹原涼子), Japanese composer, pianist, music educator
Ryoko Kobayashi (小林涼子, born 1989), Japanese actress
Ryōko Kuninaka (国仲 涼子, born 1979), Japanese actress and singer 
Ryōko Nagata (永田 亮子, born 1975), Japanese voice actress
Ryoko Nakano (中野 良子, born 1950), Japanese actress
Ryōko Ono (小野 涼子, born 1977), Japanese voice actress
, Japanese speed skater
Ryōko Shinohara (篠原 涼子, born 1973), Japanese singer and actress
Ryōko Shintani (新谷良子, born 1981), Japanese singer and voice actress
Ryōko Shiraishi (白石 涼子, born 1982), Japanese voice actress
, Japanese biathlete
Ryoko Tani (谷 亮子, (née Tamura, 田村), born 1975), Japanese former judoka and current politician
, Japanese swimmer
Ryoko Watanabe (渡辺　良子, born 1961), Japanese pink film actress, adult video performer, and gravure idol who was popular in the 1980s
Ryoko Yamagishi (山岸 凉子, born 1947), Japanese female manga artist
Ryoko Yonekura (米倉涼子, born 1975), Japanese  actress and fashion model

Fictional characters 
 Ryoko Kano, a playable character from Fighter's History
 Ryoko Hakubi (白眉 魎呼), a character from Tenchi Muyo!
 Ryoko Izumo from World Heroes
 Ryoko Hata (波多 量子), a character from Battle Royale II: Requiem
 Ryoko Mendo, a character from Urusei Yatsura
 Ryoko Kakyoin, a character from Kureijī Daiyamondo no Akuryō-teki Shitsuren
 Ryoko Subaru, a character from Martian Successor Nadesico
 Ryoko Kobato, a character in the Revue Starlight franchise

References

Japanese feminine given names